Ambohibary is a rural commune in Madagascar. It belongs to the district of Moramanga, which is a part of Alaotra-Mangoro Region. It is situated 20 km from Moramanga. The population of the commune was 35,923 in 2018.

Primary and junior level secondary education are available in town. The majority 93% of the population of the commune are farmers.  The most important crop is rice, while other important products are bananas, beans and cassava.  Services provide employment for 7% of the population.

Roads
The commune is situated along the National Road 44.

Industries
Usine Militaire de Moramanga: In Ambohibary is situated the only armament factory of Madagascar.
Ambatovy mine - cobalt & nickel mine

References
(in French:) Cas des Communes rurales d’Ambohibary et de Morarano Gare face au projet minier d’Ambatovy

Populated places in Alaotra-Mangoro